Sir Robert Nairn Gillies  (born 14 February 1925), commonly known as Bom Gillies, is a former New Zealand soldier who served with B Company, 28th (Māori) Battalion, during World War II. He is the last surviving member of the Māori Battalion, and was knighted on 31 December 2021.

Biography
Born in [Hawkes Bay] on 14 February 1925, Gillies is of Māori descent, affiliating to Ngāti Whakaue and Ngāti Kahungunu. Aged 17, he enlisted in the army, giving a date of birth. In 1943, he left as a private in the 10th Reinforcements, 2nd New Zealand Expeditionary Force, landing in North Africa at the end of the Western Desert campaign. He then fought in the Italian campaign, sustaining injuries at Orsogna. After recovering, he continued serving with the Māori Battalion until the end of the war, including at the Battle of Monte Cassino.

In his later years, Gillies has represented the Māori Battalion at many local, national and international commemorations. He attended the ceremonies in Italy marking the 70th and 75th anniversaries of the Battle of Monte Cassino in 2014 and 2019, and led the celebration on the 75th anniversary of the return of B Company to Rotorua in 2021. Gillies has been a trustee of the 28th Māori Battalion B Company History Trust since 2013, and been active in the Te Arawa Returned Services Association.

Honours
In 2019, Gillies was appointed a Cavaliere (Knight) of the Order of Merit of the Italian Republic, which he said he accepted on behalf of the entire Māori Battalion.

In the 2022 New Year Honours, Gillies was appointed a Knight Companion of the New Zealand Order of Merit, for services to Māori and war commemoration. He had previously declined the honour, but accepted it on behalf of all those who had served, saying: "There are many soldiers who did more and who have never been recognised. I accept on behalf of all the boys, all my mates who served in the Māori Battalion."

References

1925 births
Living people
People from Rotorua
Ngāti Whakaue people
Ngāti Kahungunu people
New Zealand military personnel of World War II
Knights of the Order of Merit of the Italian Republic
Knights Companion of the New Zealand Order of Merit